First City Tower, located at 1001 Fannin, is a skyscraper in downtown Houston, Texas. The building rises  in height. Completed in 1981, it contains 49 floors. First City Tower currently stands as the 14th-tallest building in the city. The architectural firm who designed the building was Morris-Aubry, and was built by W. S. Bellows Construction Corporation. The structure is an example of late-modernist architecture. The tower, which formerly housed the headquarters of the now-defunct First City National Bank, now serves as the global headquarters of Waste Management, Inc, and the headquarters of Vinson & Elkins. It also houses the U.S. headquarters of Campus Living Villages.

The building, with Class A office space, has  of office space. The building is noted for its distinctive "staircase cuts" on the north and south facades, and is composed mostly of aluminum and green-tinted glass. These designs were designed to represent the letter "F" for the building's developer and first major tenant, First City Bank, which was itself founded by attorneys of the international law firm Vinson & Elkins. First City Tower was constructed in a diagonal rotation away from Houston's main north–south street grid, which gives the impression that the structure has a larger footprint than it actually does.

History
Morris Architects designed First City Tower, which opened in 1981. JMB Realty owned one third of First City Tower since the late 1980s.

In 2002, Waste Management, Inc., and Vinson & Elkins, and Ocean Energy Inc. were the major tenants and Insignia/ESG, the managing agent, was also a tenant. In October 2002, the building became the first in Houston to implement an in-house courier intercept center in order to provide a central collection point for all inbound and outbound deliveries serving its several tenants.

In 2003, JMB Realty bought the First City Tower and a 10-story parking garage, which houses the Houston Club, for an amount reported by the Houston Business Journal as $114 million. As of 2003, the largest tenant is Vinson & Elkins, which by that year had renewed its lease until 2020.

By 2004, Ocean Energy, after being acquired by Devon Energy, vacated  of space in the First City Tower. In the same year, renovations to the tower began. FC Tower Property Partners, the owner and a limited partnership operated by an affiliate of JMB Realty, selected Morris Architects to design the public spaces in the tower. CB Richard Ellis, the property manager, oversaw the construction management. Granite pavers and landscaped planters were placed in the north and south plazas. The entrance columns were re-clad in stainless steel. A limestone monument, displaying the address and tenants of the First City Tower, was erected at the intersection of Fannin and Lamar. A private garden, used by tenants to host performances and receptions, was added.

In November 2010, SSY Chemicals leased space in the building.

See also

List of tallest buildings in Texas
Architecture of Houston

References

External links
Official Site

Bank company headquarters in the United States
Skyscraper office buildings in Houston
Headquarters in the United States
Buildings and structures in Houston
1981 establishments in Texas
Office buildings completed in 1981